Saja Umm Ar-Rimth Natural Reserve is a protected area in Saudi Arabia managed by the Saudi Wildlife Authority.

Overview 
It was designated as a natural reserve in 1995.

Birdlife 
The reserve is a destination for migrant Houbara. In 1998, the reserve is selected as a site for Houbara re-introduction.

See also 

 List of protected areas of Saudi Arabia

References 



Protected areas of Saudi Arabia